Robina Forrester Hardy (died 1891), known professionally as Robina F. Hardy, was a Scottish Victorian author, poet and Christian missionary.

Life and career 
Hardy was the daughter of a doctor and grand-daughter of a minister at St. Giles' Cathedral.

Career and Works 
Hardy's fiction draws on the experiences she gained whilst working as a missionary in the Grassmarket slums, described as 'brutally realistic'. Her work has also been linked to the Scottish kailyard school and the popular fiction of Annie S. Swan. Furthermore, she became a contributor and sub-editor for the Morning Rays, a Church of Scotland magazine for children, with much of her children's  literature subsequently being published separately. Other work includes her time as a cookery teacher at Dr. William Robertson's Vennel School for girls.

Works 
 Whin-bloom (1879; poems)
 Hester Glen's Holidays, and How She Spent Them (1881)
 The Pearl Necklace: a Story for the Young (1881)
 Little Goldenlocks (1882) 
 Nannette's New Shoes (1882)
 Jock Halliday: a Grassmarket Hero (1883)
 Glenairlie; or, the Last of the Graemes (1884)
 Tom Telfer's Shadow: a Story of Everyday Life (1884)
 Trot's message; or, 'Whom have I in Heaven but Thee?''' (1884)
 Katie: an Edinburgh Lassie (1886)
 The Story of a Cuckoo Clock (1887)
 The Good Ship Rover (1888)
  Kilgarvie (1889)
 Johnnie; or, 'Only a Life (1889)
 Diarmid; or, Friends in Kettletown (1889)
 Fanny's Old Frock (1890)
 Tibby's Tryst; or, 'I Will Lift Up Mine Eyes Unto the Hills''' (1891)
 Polly, Who was 'Nobody's Child (1891)
 His Own Master (1891)

References

External links

Scottish poets
Scottish writers